Admiral Cochrane may refer to:

Alexander Cochrane (1758–1832), British Royal Navy admiral
Archibald Cochrane (Royal Navy officer, born 1874) (1874–1952), British Royal Navy rear admiral
Arthur Cochrane (Royal Navy officer) (1824–1905), British Royal Navy admiral
Edward L. Cochrane (1892–1959), U.S. Navy vice admiral
Nathaniel Day Cochrane (1780–1844), British Royal Navy rear admiral
Thomas Cochrane, 10th Earl of Dundonald (1775–1860), British Royal Navy admiral
Thomas John Cochrane (1789–1872), British Royal Navy admiral